You Ju-an (born 1 October 1998) is a South Korean football forward who plays for Suwon Samsung Bluewings.

Career
You started his career with Suwon Samsung Bluewings.

References

External links 
 

1998 births
Living people
Association football forwards
South Korean footballers
Suwon Samsung Bluewings players
K League 1 players
People from Gwangmyeong
Sportspeople from Gyeonggi Province